The 2019–20 West Ham United F.C. Women season was the club's 29th season in existence and their second in the FA Women's Super League, the highest level of the football pyramid. Along with competing in the WSL, the club also contested two domestic cup competitions: the FA Cup and the League Cup.

On 13 March 2020, in line with the FA's response to the coronavirus pandemic, it was announced the season was temporarily suspended until at least 3 April 2020. After further postponements, the season was ultimately ended prematurely on 25 May 2020 with immediate effect. West Ham sat in 8th at the time and retained their position on sporting merit after The FA Board's decision to award places on a points-per-game basis.

Squad

Pre-season 
West Ham arranged five friendly matches in preparation for the 2019–20 season, including two open to the public against Bristol City and Tottenham Hotspur.

FA Women's Super League

Results summary

Results by matchday

Results

League table

Women's FA Cup 

As a member of the top two tiers, West Ham entered the FA Cup in the fourth round, losing 2–0 to Arsenal in one of only two all-WSL ties.

FA Women's League Cup

Group stage

Squad statistics

Appearances 

Starting appearances are listed first, followed by substitute appearances after the + symbol where applicable.

|-
|colspan="14"|Players away from the club on loan:

|-
|colspan="14"|Players who appeared for West Ham United but left during the season:

|}

Goalscorers

Transfers

Transfers in

Transfers out

Loans out

References 

West Ham United